Peter Wennerstrom (born September 7, 1988) is a Swedish professional ice hockey player who currently plays for Stjernen of the Norwegian GET-ligaen. He previously played for Färjestads BK.

References

External links

1988 births
Asplöven HC players
Bofors IK players
Färjestad BK players
Living people
Örebro HK players
Stjernen Hockey players
Swedish ice hockey right wingers